Edwin Jarvis Randall (October 24, 1869 – June 13, 1962) was a bishop of The Episcopal Church, serving in Chicago.

References

1869 births
1962 deaths
Episcopal bishops of Chicago